The  Palo Corona Ranch, also known as Fish Ranch, was once a private ranch located on the northern end of Big Sur, California, between Garrapata State Park to the west, Carmel Valley on the north, and Santa Lucia Preserve to the east. The ranch is now owned by Monterey Peninsula Regional Park District (MPRPD) In 2002, the Big Sur Land Trust and The Nature Conservancy acquired the land and transferred ownership to MPRPD in 2004, which created the Palo Corona Regional Park. Key habitat and resources include coastal grasslands and woodland, ponds, and perennial creeks.

History

The ranch was part of the Rancho San José y Sur Chiquito Mexican land grant to the west, with some inland areas within the Rancho Potrero de San Carlos land grant. Fish built a home and ranch on the property and ran a heard of Hereford cattle. In 1929, the ranch barn was designed and built by M. J. Murphy.

In 1930, Charles Lindbergh and his wife Anne Morrow Lindbergh stayed at the ranch as guests while on an extended honeymoon, and Lindbergh flew a glider from a ridge at the ranch. Eight men towed the glider to the ridge where he soared over the countryside for 10 minutes and brought the plane down 3 miles below the Highlands Inn.    

McCaw outbid the Big Sur Land Trust and the Save the Redwoods League in buying the property. The asking price was $7.5 million but sold for about $10 million. At that time, Fish Ranch stretched southeast about  along the Carmel River south to the Los Padres National Forest. 

Environmentalists were concerned that the Palo Corona Ranch would be converted to an estate-type development like Rancho San Carlos, now Santa Lucia Preserve. In May 2002, The Nature Conservancy and the Big Sur Land Trust, joined together, and bought the Palo Corona Ranch from McCaw for $37 million. Their plan was to sell it to the state of California and to a regional park district.

In 2004, the Monterey Peninsula Regional Park District (MPRPD) purchased the remaining  middle portion of the Palo Corona Ranch from The Nature Conservancy and the Big Sur Land Trust for the appraised value of $10.2 million. Once finalized in 2004, Palo Corona Ranch became the largest land conservation in Monterey County and one of the most significant due to its size and habitat. The acreage was then divided between the California Department of Fish and Wildlife and MPRPD for protection. The Palo Corona Regional Park was created from the northern . In 2016, MPRPD acquired  of the Rancho Caňada Country Club and golf course in Carmel Valley, which provides public access to the Palo Corona Regional Park.

References

External links
 

  

Big Sur
Carmel Valley, California
Monterey County, California